Two Liberty ships were named William A. Dobson. Both were launched in 1944 so they are disambiguated by month of launch.

 
 

Ship names